The women's 48 kilograms weightlifting event at the 2012 Summer Olympics in London, United Kingdom, took place at ExCeL London on 28 July.

Summary
Total score was the sum of the lifter's best result in each of the snatch and the clean and jerk, with three lifts allowed for each lift.  In case of a tie, the lighter lifter won; if still tied, the lifter who took the fewest attempts to achieve the total score won.  Lifters without a valid snatch score did not perform the clean and jerk.

Schedule
All times are British Summer Time (UTC+01:00)

Records

 Chen Xiexia's Olympic records were rescinded in 2017.
 Nurcan Taylan's world record was rescinded in 2021.

Results

References 

Results 

Weightlifting at the 2012 Summer Olympics
Women's events at the 2012 Summer Olympics
Olymp